HP4 or variant, may refer to:

 HP4, a postcode for Berkhamsted, see HP postcode area
 hP4, a Pearson symbol
 Harry Potter and the Goblet of Fire, the fourth Harry Potter novel
 Harry Potter and the Goblet of Fire (film), the fourth Harry Potter film
 Handley Page Type D a.k.a. H.P.4, an airplane
 HP-4, a glider designed by Richard Schreder
 HP4, a type of photographic stock, see Ilford HP
 HP4, a version of the BMW S1000RR produced between 2013 and 2014.

See also
HP (disambiguation)